Lee Kang-Min (born August 29, 1985) is a South Korean football player.

In 2007, he joined Korea National League side Gangneung City FC. In gangneung, he played 35 games and scored 6 goals.

On November 20, 2008, Gangwon was called Lee as extra order at 2009 K-League Draft.

Club career statistics

Honours

Club
Chuncheon FC
Challengers League
Runners-up : 2012

Individual 
KFA Challengers League player of the Year: 2012

References

External links
 

1985 births
Living people
South Korean footballers
Gangneung City FC players
Gangwon FC players
Korea National League players
K League 1 players
K3 League players
Kyung Hee University alumni
Association football midfielders